Gregor Florian Gysi (born 16 January 1948) is a German attorney, former president of the Party of the European Left and a prominent politician of The Left (Die Linke) political party.

He belonged to the reformist wing of the governing Socialist Unity Party of Germany at the time of the pro-democracy transition inspired by then Soviet leader Mikhail Gorbachev. He has strongly denied allegations that he used to assist the Stasi, the East German secret police. He was the last leader of the Socialist Unity Party of Germany and led the effort that transformed it into the post-Communist Party of Democratic Socialism (PDS), forerunner of The Left.

Family background
Gysi was born in Berlin-Lichtenberg in East Berlin, Soviet Zone of Germany. His father was Klaus Gysi, a high-ranking official in East Germany who served as the Minister of Culture from 1966 to 1973. His mother, Irene Olga Lydia Gysi (née Lessing; 1912–2007), was the sister of political activist Gottfried Lessing, who was married to British writer and Nobel laureate Doris Lessing during his exile in Southern Rhodesia. The surname "Gysi" is of Swiss-German origin. He is of partial Jewish ancestry; his paternal grandmother was Jewish, as was one of his maternal great-grandfathers. One of his maternal great-grandmothers was Russian. His sister, Gabriele, is an actress who left East Germany in 1985. Today, she is chief dramaturge at the Volksbühne in Berlin.

Career

Pre-1989
Gysi's political career began in the then-ruling Socialist Unity Party of Germany (SED) of East Germany, to which he was admitted in 1967. In 1971 he became a licensed attorney, and during the 1970s and 1980s defended several prominent dissidents, including Rudolf Bahro, Robert Havemann, Ulrike Poppe, and Bärbel Bohley.

In addition to his legal work, Gysi emerged as one of East Germany's leading Gorbachev-inspired political reformists within the SED, especially towards the end of the 1980s. In 1989, he and a group of lawyers presented a counter-draft to the government's Travel Bill, which authorised mass public demonstrations. This led to a mass rally on East-Berlin's Alexanderplatz on 4 November in which he spoke and called for reforms, including free elections. In December 1989, he became a member of a special SED party session investigating official corruption and abuse of power.

Fall of Communism

In an interview conducted in 2011, Gysi recalled that in late 1989 he had become the attorney for several of the people who were arrested in the first early public protests. As such he became known to leading figures in the Artistic and Cultural unions and was contacted by a group of actresses about the legality of a large demonstration. He recalls having examined the laws and advising them that they could apply for such a permit from the police and the worst outcome would be that their request could be denied, but they would not be breaking any law or doing anything illegal. He further recalls assisting the group in requesting and completing the appropriate forms and paperwork required for such a permit. 

In December 1989, Egon Krenz, the last Communist leader of East Germany, resigned all of his posts. Gysi was elected as the party's chairman. He did not, however, become the leader of East Germany; the SED had abandoned its monopoly of power on 1 December. In his first speech, Gysi admitted that the SED had brought the country to ruin, repudiating everything it had done since 1949. He declared that the party needed to adopt a new form of socialism.

To that end, he immediately set about transforming the SED into a democratic socialist party. Before the year was out, the last hardliners in the SED leadership had either resigned or been pushed out. On 16 December, the SED was renamed the Socialist Unity Party – Party of Democratic Socialism (SED-PDS), it later became simply the Party of Democratic Socialism (PDS). Gysi remained as party chairman, and in March 1990 was elected to the Volkskammer in the first free election of that body, serving there until it was dissolved upon German reunification on 3 October 1990.

Post-unification
In the first post-reunification all-German elections, he was elected to the Bundestag from Berlin's Hellersdorf–Marzahn constituency, and served there until 2000. He remained chairman of the PDS through 1998, and then from 1998 to 2000 served as chairman of the party's parliamentary group.

In 1992, it was alleged Gysi was an "unofficial collaborator" (Inoffizieller Mitarbeiter, IM) or informant of East Germany's Ministry for State Security (the Stasi). He denied these allegations, and the matter was largely dropped due to his parliamentary immunity. In 1995, the Hamburg regional court ruled in Gysi's favour in a complaint against Bärbel Bohley, Gysi's former client, who had accused him of Stasi collaboration. However, the allegations were raised again in 1996, and this time the Bundestag voted to revoke his immunity and proceed with an investigation.

In 1998, the Bundestag's immunity committee concluded that Gysi had been a collaborator with the Stasi from 1978 to 1989 under the name IM Notar, and fined him 8,000 Deutsche Marks. However, both the Free Democratic Party and his own PDS disputed the verdict, and Gysi appealed against the finding. Despite the affair, he retained his seat in the Bundestag in the 1998 elections.

In 2000, he resigned as chairman of the PDS's parliamentary group, but continued as an active member of the party. Following the victory of a "Red-red" (SPD-PDS) coalition in the 2001 Berlin state election, he was elected Senator for Economics, Labour, and Women's Issues and Deputy Mayor. He emphasised practical issues and advocated the reinstitution of some of what he sees as the better aspects of East Germany's system, such as extended child-care hours and a longer school day. After a scandal involving his use of airline "bonus miles" he had acquired on trips as a Bundestag member, he resigned on 31 July 2002 from the Berlin city government. The resignation was a blow to his public "can-do" image, but he has recovered from that to some extent in the wake of increasing public opposition to a number of new policies of the federal government, like the Hartz reforms lowering unemployment benefits to the levels of mere subsistence welfare, which he strongly opposes.

 
In late-2004, he survived brain surgery and a heart attack. Formerly a heavy smoker, Gysi quit smoking as a result of surviving the heart attack.

Gysi remained the PDS's undisputed front man in many people's minds and continued to appear in public. In May 2005, when Federal Chancellor Gerhard Schröder announced plans to call an early election in September, many prominent PDS leaders including chair Lothar Bisky called on Gysi to front their campaign. He was a lead candidate of the PDS, and returned to the Bundestag as the member for Berlin-Treptow-Köpenick. The PDS fought the election in an alliance with the new western-based Labour and Social Justice – The Electoral Alternative (WASG), under the new name The Left Party.PDS, with Gysi at times sharing a platform with WASG leader Oskar Lafontaine, former finance minister (in the first months of the Schröder government) and formerly party leader of the SPD. In June 2007, the PDS and WASG formally merged to form a united party called The Left.

In 2014, Gysi wrote his analysis on the contemporary Ukraine crisis in the Israel Journal of Foreign Affairs, where he described similarities between the United States and Russia in their transgressions of international law. Gysi calls for "a new Ostpolitik" to prevent war and promote "democracy and freedom in Russia". In 2015, Gysi was one of the leading supporters of Greece during the Greek government-debt crisis. He described the current German government as "blackmailers".

Gysi is an outspoken supporter of the Campaign for the Establishment of a United Nations Parliamentary Assembly, an organisation which campaigns for democratic reformation of the United Nations. This is due to his belief in the need for "functioning and democratically legitimate global politics."

In the 2021 German federal elections Gysi once more won his constituency of Berlin-Treptow-Köpenick allowing his party, which had failed to surpass the electoral threshold, representation in the Bundestag proportional to their vote share as his win, together with those of Gesine Lötzsch in Berlin-Lichtenberg and Sören Pellmann in Leipzig II, were enough to secure three constituency wins, which allow a party to bypass the electoral threshold.

Controversies

Stasi informant "IM Notar"
Gysi continues to deny allegations, which first surfaced in 1992, that he was a Stasi informant ("inoffizieller Mitarbeiter"), though there are no doubts about their close cooperation. Invited in 2017 to spell out who, other than himself, "IM Notar" could possibly be, he replied that he had a strong suspicion, backed by a huge amount of information, adding pointedly that whenever the allegations that he himself was "IM Notar" have come before a court, he has "always won". In the absence of certain proof, he is not prepared to disclose the identity of the true "IM Notar".

"Toiletgate" (2014)
In November 2014, after being invited by Inge Höger and Annette Groth, also members of The Left (Die Linke) to talk with them in the Bundestag, journalists Max Blumenthal and David Sheen learned that Gysi tried to cancel the meetings on the grounds that Blumenthal and Sheen held extremist views from which he wished to dissociate the party.

Gysi fled, followed by the two men and other parliamentary members down a parliament corridor and into a bathroom in an incident referred to as "toiletgate". After this event, Blumenthal and Sheen were banned from ever setting foot in the Bundestag again.

Comments on Germans and Immigration (2015)
In a 2015 interview, Gysi stated that "Every year more Germans die than are born. Fortunately, this is due to the fact that the Nazis do not reproduce particularly well and therefore, we depend on immigrants from other countries." The comparison of all Germans to Nazis and the statement that it was good that Germans had a declining birth rate generated significant criticism from the public.

References

External links

 Will Germany Go Left of the Left? by Markus Deggerich, Der Spiegel, 25 September 2009
 Portrait at the website of the parliamentary group of the Left Party
 Biography at Deutsches Historisches Museum

1948 births
German people of Jewish descent
German people of Swiss descent
German people of Russian descent
Living people
Members of the Bundestag for Berlin
Senators of Berlin
Members of the Bundestag 2021–2025
Members of the Bundestag 2017–2021
Members of the Bundestag 2013–2017
Members of the Bundestag 2009–2013
Members of the Bundestag 2005–2009
Members of the Bundestag 1998–2002
Members of the Bundestag 1994–1998
Members of the Bundestag 1990–1994
Members of the Bundestag 1987–1990
Members of the Bundestag for The Left
People from East Berlin
People from Berlin
People from Lichtenberg